Euxoa mustelina is a moth of the family Noctuidae. It is found in Turkey, Iran, Armenia, Turkmenia, Issyk-Kul region, Ili, Saisan, the Altai mountains and western Siberia. It has also been recorded from Romania.

Subspecies
Euxoa mustelina mustelina
Euxoa mustelina centralis

External links
Fauna Europaea

Euxoa
Moths of the Middle East
Moths of Europe
Moths of Asia
Moths described in 1877